Tehovec may refer to:

Tehovec, Czech Republic
 Tehovec, Slovenia